Magic Kingdom is a Belgian power metal band formed in 1998 by guitarist Dushan Petrossi.

Timeline

Discography 
The Arrival (1999)
Metallic Tragedy (2004)
Symphony of War (2010)
Savage Requiem (2015)
MetAlmighty (2019)

References

External links 
 Official website

Musical groups established in 1998
Power metal musical groups
Belgian heavy metal musical groups